Chivay is a town in the Colca valley, capital of the Caylloma province in the Arequipa region, Peru. Located at about 3,600 m above sea level (12,000 ft), it lies upstream of the renowned Colca Canyon. It has a central town square and an active market. Ten km to the east, and 1,500 metres above the town of Chivay lies the Chivay obsidian source.

Thermal springs are located 3 km from town; a number of heated pools have been constructed. A stone "Inca" bridge crosses the Colca River ravine, just to the north of the town. The town is a popular staging point for tourists visiting Condor Cross or Cruz Del Condor, where condors can be seen catching thermal uplifts a few kilometres downstream.

See also 
 Ankachita
 Q'illu Q'illu
 Uskallaqta
 Warank'anthi

References

External links

Populated places in the Arequipa Region